Piperlongumine (also called piplartine or piperlongumin) is an amide alkaloid constituent of the fruit of the long pepper (Piper longum), a pepper plant found in southern India and southeast Asia. When extracted, piperlongumine may cause skin, eye or respiratory tract irritation.

Traditional medicine and research
Long peppers have been used in Ayurveda and traditional Chinese medicine as a supposed treatment.

Targtex, a biotechnology spin-off of the Portuguese Institute for Molecular Biology, developed a piperlongumine hydrogel that is to be applied after the removal of Glioblastoma tumours, with the goal of neutralizing remaining cancer cells. The hydrogel was effective in laboratory and animal studies and is scheduled for Phase I human clinical trials sometime in 2023.

References 

Imides
Phenol ethers
Tetrahydropyridines